Nelle Clyde Wilson Reagan (July 24, 1883 – July 25, 1962) was the mother of United States President Ronald Reagan (1911–2004) and his older brother Neil Reagan (1908–1996).

Early life
Nelle was born in Fulton, Illinois, the oldest of seven children of Mary Ann (née Elsey) and Thomas Wilson.  Her father was of Scottish descent (partly by way of Canada) while her mother was English, born in Epsom, Surrey.

Nelle met Jack Reagan in a farm town along the Illinois prairie.  The two were married in Fulton in November 1904. They had two children: Neil "Moon" Reagan and Ronald Wilson Reagan. After the birth of her second son, Nelle was told not to have any more children. The Reagan family moved from Tampico to many small Illinois towns, and Chicago, depending on Jack's employment.

Workings with the church

Ronald Reagan wrote that his mother "always expected to find the best in people and often did". She attended the Disciples of Christ church regularly and was active, and very influential, within it; she frequently led Sunday school services and gave the Bible readings to the congregation during the services. A strong believer in the power of prayer, she led prayer meetings at church and was in charge of mid-week prayers when the pastor was out of town. She was also an adherent of the Social Gospel movement. Her strong commitment to the church is what induced her son Ronald to become a Protestant Christian rather than a Roman Catholic like his father.

Due to her influence within the church community, one member of the congregation said that "Many of us believed Nelle Reagan had the gift to heal", and fellow churchgoer Mildred Neer recalled Reagan's strong passion for prayer:

Aside from her work with the church, Nelle acted in many plays. One 1926 review of the play The Ship of Faith said, "Mrs. Reagan is one of Dixon's favorite readers and has appeared before many audiences, always greatly pleasing them."

Later life and death
In 1938, after both Neil and Ronald Reagan had moved to California, Ronald bought his parents a new home in Hollywood; it was the first home they had ever owned. Nelle's life also changed after her husband Jack's death on May 18, 1941, leaving her widowed. She maintained her connections to the church in Dixon and began working at a tuberculosis sanitarium in Southern California. In her later years, however, Nelle had problems with her physical health and senility (later diagnosed as Alzheimer's disease). Speaking of her illness, she said "I just kept my mind on God." Nelle died from complications of the disease on July 25, 1962, a day after her 79th birthday.

See also
 Birthplace of Ronald Reagan

Notes

References
 
 
 

Click here for "Nelle Reagan - The Untold Story."

1883 births
1962 deaths
American Disciples of Christ
American people of English descent
American people of Scottish descent
Burials at Calvary Cemetery (Los Angeles)
Mothers of presidents of the United States
People from Lee County, Illinois
People from Fulton, Illinois
Reagan family
Works Progress Administration workers
People from Tampico, Illinois
Deaths from dementia in California
Deaths from Alzheimer's disease